Jessica Cattaneo (born 8 December 1996) is a Peruvian swimmer. She competed in the women's 100 metre freestyle event at the 2018 FINA World Swimming Championships (25 m), in Hangzhou, China.

References

External links
 

1996 births
Living people
Peruvian female freestyle swimmers
Place of birth missing (living people)
Competitors at the 2018 South American Games
South American Games medalists in swimming
South American Games bronze medalists for Peru
Swimmers at the 2015 Pan American Games
Swimmers at the 2019 Pan American Games
Pan American Games competitors for Peru
Competitors at the 2017 Summer Universiade
20th-century Peruvian women
21st-century Peruvian women